The California, Arizona and Santa Fe Railway was a non-operating subsidiary (paper railroad) of Atchison, Topeka and Santa Fe Railway (ATSF).   It was incorporated in 1911, and was merged into the ATSF in 1963.  

California, Arizona and Santa Fe would ultimately be absorbed by Burlington Northern Santa Fe Railway.

Route

It owned the ATSF lines between Phoenix–Ash Fork and Phoenix–Mojave. It leased/purchased the tracks built by the Southern Pacific Railroad across the Mojave Desert between Needles and Mojave in Southern California.

Other predecessors

Arizona and California Railway
Barnwell and Searchlight Railway
Bradshaw Mountain Railroad
California Eastern Railway
Oakland and East Side Railroad
Prescott and Eastern Railroad
Randsburg Railway
Santa Fe, Prescott and Phoenix Railway

See also

References

Defunct California railroads
Defunct Arizona railroads
Predecessors of the Atchison, Topeka and Santa Fe Railway
History of the Mojave Desert region
American companies established in 1911
Railway companies established in 1911
Railway companies disestablished in 1963
1911 establishments in California
1963 disestablishments in California
Mojave, California
Needles, California
American companies disestablished in 1963